Holy Barbarians may refer to:

Holy Barbarians (band), a band formed by former The Cult frontman Ian Astbury
The Holy Barbarians, a 1959 book by Lawrence Lipton